Najrul Hoque (born 31 January 1970 in Sagolia, Assam) is an All India United Democratic Front politician from Assam. He was elected in Assam Legislative Assembly election in 2016 from Dhubri constituency.

References 

Living people
All India United Democratic Front politicians
People from Dhubri district
Assam MLAs 2016–2021
1970 births